Edward Williston Frentz (May 1863 – August 28, 1943) was an American archer. He competed in the men's double York round and the men's double American round at the 1904 Summer Olympics.

References

External links

1863 births
1943 deaths
Olympic archers of the United States
American male archers
Archers at the 1904 Summer Olympics
Sportspeople from Maine
Date of birth missing